Professor Vilen Naumovich Komissarov (August 23, 1924 – June 8, 2005) has gained recognition in Russia and beyond its borders as an authority on translation theory and methods of translator training (in Russian: Perevodovediniye - ПЕРЕВОДОВЕДЕНИЕ ), Head of the Department of Translation Theory, History and Criticism at Moscow State Linguistic University, he has a record of half a century of research and teaching in this field, as well as of practical work as a conference interpreter and translator.

Selected bibliography
Komissarov has over ninety publications, including books.
 A Word on Translation (1973)
 Linguistics of Translation (1980)
 Theory of Translation (1990)
 Theoretical Basic of Methods of Translator Training (1997)
 General Theory of Translation (1999)

External links
 (Part of Book) Modern translation science (perevodovedenie). Modern translation. A course of lectures. Schoolbook. ETS Publishing House, 2004
 Linguistic translation science in Russia. Schoolbook. M.- ETS Publishing House and Poluglossum, 2002.  
 Image of last book by Prof. Komissarov - Modern translation science (perevodovedenie). Modern translation. A course of lectures. Schoolbook. ETS Publishing House, 2004)

Komissarov, Vilen
Soviet translators
1924 births
2005 deaths
Russian translation scholars
20th-century Russian translators
20th-century linguists
Academic staff of Moscow State Linguistic University